Captain Daniel Woodriff  (17 November 1756 – 25 February 1842) was a British Royal Navy officer and navigator in the late-eighteenth and early-nineteenth centuries. He made two voyages to Australia.

Biography
Woodriff was commissioned as a lieutenant on 1 April 1783, and received promotion to the rank of commander on 18 September 1795, and to captain on 28 April 1802.

Voyage to Australia

They were bound for Port Phillip in the Bass Strait, on the southern extremity of Australia, with the intention of setting up a settlement there under the command of David Collins. Calcutta sailed from Spithead on 28 April 1803, in company with the storeship Ocean, calling at Rio de Janeiro in July, and the Cape of Good Hope in August, arriving at their intended destination in October. Whilst in Sydney, Woodriff and the crew of Calcutta assisted in suppressing the Castle Hill convict rebellion. For that service, Woodriff received a  land grant near Penrith, New South Wales in 1804.

Calcutta then sailed back to England via Cape Horn and Rio de Janeiro, arriving at Spithead on 23 July 1804, thereby completing a circumnavigation of the globe in ten months and three days.

Action of 26 September 1805

The Calcutta was refitted as a 50-gun ship, and sent to Saint Helena to escort merchant ships back to England. She arrived there on 3 August 1804 and sailed in company with six merchant ships back to England. Unfortunately, on 26 September, as the convoy approached the entrance to the English Channel, they encountered a powerful French squadron. Woodriff attacked, sacrificing his own ship in order to give the convoy a chance to escape, which all but one did, while the Calcutta was forced to surrender. In June 1807, Woodriff was released in a prisoner exchange, and promptly court-martialled for the loss of his ship. He was honourably acquitted, and his conduct was pronounced to have been that of "a brave, cool, and intrepid officer."

Later career
In 1808 Woodriff was appointed agent for prisoners of war at Forton, near Gosport. Towards the end of the war he served as Resident Commissioner at Jamaica. He was admitted into the Royal Hospital, Greenwich, on 9 November 1830, and was appointed a Companion of the Order of the Bath on 26 September 1831, on the occasion of King William IV's Coronation Honours.

Family

He was born on 17 December 1756, the son of John Woodriff of Deptford, Kent.

He married Asia Sumarel (1764–1827); they had three daughters, and three sons: Capt.  Daniel James Woodriff RN (1787–1860), Cdr. John Robert Woodriff RN (1790–1868), and Lt. Robert Mathews Woodriff RN (1792–1820).

References

Further reading

1756 births
1842 deaths
Royal Navy officers
Royal Navy personnel of the Napoleonic Wars
Convictism in Australia
Companions of the Order of the Bath